is a railway station in the city of Kaminoyama, Yamagata Prefecture, Japan, operated by East Japan Railway Company (JR East). It takes its name after the Mokichi Saitō Memorial Museum.

Lines
Mokichi-Kinenkan-mae Station is served by the Ōu Main Line, and is located 77.8 rail kilometers from the terminus of the line at Fukushima Station.

Station layout
The station has two opposed side platforms connected via a level crossing. The station is unattended.

Platforms

History
The station was absorbed into the JR East network upon the privatization of JNR on 1 April 1987. It was renamed to its present name on 1 July 1992.

Surrounding area
The surrounding area is of rice paddies and small rural communities.

External links

 JR East Station information 

Stations of East Japan Railway Company
Railway stations in Yamagata Prefecture
Ōu Main Line
Railway stations in Japan opened in 1952
Kaminoyama, Yamagata